The Cabinet Wulff I was the state government of the German state of Lower Saxony from 4 March 2003 until 26 February 2008. The Cabinet was headed by Minister President Christian Wulff and was formed by the Christian Democratic Union and the Free Democratic Party. On 4 March 2003 Wulff was elected and sworn in as Minister President by the Landtag of Lower Saxony, after Wulff's winning of the 2003 Lower Saxony state election.

Composition 

|}

References

Wulff I
2003 establishments in Germany
2008 disestablishments in Germany